Kaikeyi (Sanskrit: कैकेयी, IAST: Kaikeyī) is the second consort of King Dasharatha, and a queen of Ayodhya in the Hindu epic Ramayana. 

Out of Dasharatha's three wives, Kaikeyi exerts the most influence. Formerly the princess of Kekeya, she is described to have served as an able counsellor to her husband during times of war. She is the mother of Bharata. Initially loving and motherly towards her stepson, Prince Rama, Kaikeyi's mind is poisoned by Manthara, her maid. Under her influence, Rama is exiled to the forest for a period of fourteen years.

Legend

Birth and early life 
Kaikeyi is born to King Ashvapati of Kekeya shortly before her mother was exiled. She was raised with her only mother figure being her hunchbacked nursemaid, Manthara. She is raised with seven brothers, including her twin, Yudhājit.

Boons 
In a battle between the devas and the asuras, Dasharatha rode to Devaloka, accompanied by Kaikeyi, to help Indra fight against the asuras. The devas were at a disadvantage due to the sorcery employed by Shambara and his army of asuras. Dasharatha, riding a chariot, faced the asuras in ten directions at the same time. In this battle, his chariot had to be turned to every direction in a swift manner. During the battle, the bolt of one of the wheels slipped out, and the wheel was about to disengage when Kaikeyi inserted her thumb in the hole of the bolt, and kept the chariot steady. When the king learnt of this presence of mind on Kaikeyi's part, he was pleased, and offered her two boons. The queen said that she would ask for those two boons in the future, as she wished for nothing right then and there.

Manthara's influence and Rama's exile 
Under the custom of primogeniture, Dasharatha, with the approval of the royal assembly, selected Rama to be his heir. Kaikeyi was delighted and as happy as she would have been had it been her own son during the coronation. However, Manthara, Kaikeyi's nurse, feared that Kaikeyi would lose her status as chief queen at court if Rama ascended the throne, as Kausalya would thus become queen mother. She decided to instigate trouble. She tried to fuel Kaikeyi's jealousy and envy of Kausalya by reminding her that her son's coronation would give Kausalya her former status as the most important of Dasharatha's queens and would cut Bharata out of the line of succession forever, but this had no effect on Kaikeyi at the time.

Manthara later convinced Kaikeyi to demand two boons granted to her years earlier by Dasharatha. King Dasharatha was obliged to fulfill them. Kaikeyi demanded that Bharata be crowned king, and Rama be sent to the forest for a period of fourteen years. Hearing this, Dasharatha fell into a swoon and passed the night in a pitiable condition in Kaikeyi's palace.

Widowhood and later life 
Grief-stricken, Dasharatha died of a broken heart six days after he exiled Rama from Ayodhya. Kaikeyi came to blame herself for this death. Furthermore, Bharata swore never to ascend the throne as it was his older brother's birthright. He further blamed her for his father's death and swore never to address her as "mother" again. Realising her mistake, Kaikeyi repented sending her beloved step son away for fourteen years.

After Rama's return, she apologised to him for her sins. Rama touched her feet and said there was no need to ask for forgiveness, as he did not feel bad about what happened. He insisted that Bharata forgive his mother. Further defending Kaikeyi, Rama also argued to Bharata that this is just what mothers did. Whether good or bad, he remarked, what mothers did was for the betterment of their children, not for themselves, so it is not proper to be angry with them.

Assessment

Kaikeyi's personality and her relationships are quite revealing in Ayodhya Kanda of the Valmiki Ramayana. Kaikeyi maintained strong relations with her maternal family even after her wedding to King Dasharatha. Her brother Yudhajit visits her many times and takes a keen interest in the life of her son Bharata, often taking the latter and Shatrughna away to the Kaikeya kingdom during the summer.

Kaikeyi helped her husband Dasharatha in the Dandaka forest while he was at war. While Kaikeyi saved the king in the war, as per mythology, her left hand was strong as a diamond (a boon from a Saint) so the king accompanied her during wars.

Kaikeyi was the king's favorite queen. Kaikeyi's nature is described as being temperamental and unpredictable. While she was mostly gentle, it is evident that she disliked the king spending time with his other queens. King Dasharatha mentions that he did not treat his queen Kausalya with the love she deserved due to fear of Kaikeyi's tantrums and possessiveness.

Kaikeyi seemed almost naive when it came to understanding the rights of the four princes to Ayodhya's throne. She naively mentions to her maid Manthara that Bharata can rule Ayodhya after Ram, not understanding the law of primogeniture. It is Manthara who educates Kaikeyi of the manner of succession.

Kaikeyi's naive nature and gentleness were transformed into obstinacy and a hunger for power; all in the name of her son Bharata's welfare. Bharata contests her views vociferously and despises her for her act of banishing the rightful heir Rama to the forest for punishing him for no fault of his own. King Dasharatha tries to reason with her, arguing in terms of the stability of the kingdom, the people's will, and the court's decision to crown Rama; none of which seems reasonable to her. Finally, King Dasharatha renounces her, and yet he is unable to separate himself from her. He lingers on in his grief in her chambers in fear of the humiliation from everyone outside those chambers.

In popular culture 

 Kaikeyi is the eponymous narrator of Kaikeyi by Vaishnavi Patel, published by Redhook Books, a subsidiary of the Hachette Book Group, and a Book of the Month selection for April 2022.

References

Bibliography

External Links

 Mythological queens
Solar dynasty
 Characters_in_the_Ramayana